Warsame is a traditional Somali name meaning bearer of good news. 'War' translates into news and 'same' (bearer of good) into positivity or good in Somali. The equivalent name for girls is Warsan which means 'good news" (as name it means "she who brings good news")

Given name
Warsame Abdi Shirwa, former Minister of Information of Puntland region of Somalia
Warsame Shire Awale (1951–2012), Somali poet and playwright
Warsama Hassan Houssein, Djiboutian professional footballer

Surname
Amina Warsame, Somali social scientist
Abdirahman Abdishakur Warsame, Somali politician
Abdi Shire Warsame, Somali diplomat who was the former Somali Ambassador to Iran and Kenya
Abdi Warsame, Somali American member-elect of the Minneapolis City Council
Abdi Warsame Isaq, former chairman of the Southern Somali National Movement (SSNM)
Ahmed Warsame, the Head of the former Somali Military Academy and Somali National Front
Ahmed Abdulkadir Warsame, Somali prisoner of the United States
Ali Shire Warsame, Somali politician, General Surgeon and  businessman
Ali Haji Warsame, Somali entrepreneur, accountant, and politician
Hanad Zakaria Warsame, doctor
K'naan (Keinan Abdi Warsame), Somali-Canadian rapper
Mohamed Ibrahim Warsame 'Hadrawi', Somali poet and songwriter
Mohamed Warsame Ali, Somali politician and diplomat
Mohammed Abdullah Warsame (born 1973), Somali born Canadian citizen and suspected terrorist arrested in 2003 by American police
Saado Ali Warsame, Somali-American singer-songwriter and politician
Yasmin Warsame (born 1976), Somali-Canadian model
Yusuf Warsame Saeed, Somali politician
Zaki Warsame, Qur’an professor in Abu Hurairah Centre, Canada

References

Somali-language surnames
Somali masculine given names
Somali given names